Julio César Ceja Pedraza (born November 18, 1992) is a Mexican professional boxer. He held the WBC super bantamweight title from 2015 to 2016.

Professional career

IBF title fight
On May 11, 2013 Ceja lost to Jamie McDonnell for the IBF bantamweight world title by majority decision after Léo Santa Cruz vacated the title to move up in weight.

WBC Silver title fight
On October 12, 2013 Ceja defeated Juan José Montes by 10th-round technical knockout to win the WBC Silver bantamweight title.

WBC interim title fight
Ceja defeated Hugo Ruiz for the interim WBC World super bantamweight title.  The interim title was made available due to Léo Santa Cruz moving to featherweight. Ceja was later elevated to full title holder after Santa Cruz vacated.

Professional boxing record

See also
List of super-bantamweight boxing champions
List of Mexican boxing world champions

References

External links

1992 births
Living people
Mexican male boxers
Boxers from the State of Mexico
People from Tlalnepantla de Baz
Super-flyweight boxers
Bantamweight boxers
Super-bantamweight boxers
World super-bantamweight boxing champions
World Boxing Council champions